Sandor Robert Tralins (April 28, 1926May 20, 2010) was an American author of science fiction and pulp fiction. He reportedly wrote over 250 books, and used numerous pseudonyms.

Life 
Tralins attended Eastern College in Baltimore, later merged with the University of Baltimore. He was a Marine Corps reservist in the mid-1940s.

In 1966, Tralins sued the Federal Communications Commission, NCAA, and ABC, claiming that residents of the northern United States were being shown games of better-quality football teams than those in the south.

Career 
Tralins was evidently interested in fetish and related topics. His The Sexual Fetish describes agalmatophilia and frottage.

Kelso notes that Black Stud (1962), along with similar texts of the period that she traces to Mandingo (1957), "can perniciously reinforce hostile constructions of blacks", as they depict Black people in a dehumanizing and hypersexualized manner.

In 1963, Tralins' Pleasure Was My Business—a ghost-written account of the life and times of Rose Miller ("Madame Sherry"), a madam in Miami—was declared obscene by a Florida court. The finding was later overturned by the Supreme Court, in a per curiam opinion.

In 1964, Tralins and a neuropsychiatrist, Dr. Michael M. Gilbert, taught ten-lesson memory courses.

In 1966, he wrote Strange Events Beyond Human Understanding, a collection of stories of the paranormal. Some of his stories were adapted for television in 1992 in CBS' Miracles and Other Wonders. In 1997, Tralins' tales were adapted for the TV show Beyond Belief: Fact or Fiction.

References

External links 
 Official site via Internet Archive (archived 2007-06-26)
 
 
 Bibliography at Fantastic Fiction – with some cover images

American fortean writers
Paranormal investigators
1926 births
2010 deaths
American male novelists
20th-century American novelists
20th-century American male writers
20th-century American non-fiction writers
American male non-fiction writers